Bastard is a blackletter typeface designed by Jonathan Barnbrook in 1990.  The name derives from a typographic classification known as Bastarda.  The Bastard face is an exploration of the blackletter face (the earliest types, similar to those made by Gutenberg, and based upon monastic script) with a simple kit of parts.  The face is available in three weights: Spindly Bastard, Fat Bastard, and Even Fatter Bastard.

While the angular terminals suggest the nib of a pen, the typeface was drawn electronically and avoids curved strokes. The c. 1865 typeface Fletcher is similar in its purely geometric construction.

References 

Bain, Peter and Paul Shaw. Blackletter: Type and National Identity. Princeton Architectural Press: 1998. .
Fiedl, Frederich, Nicholas Ott and Bernard Stein. Typography: An Encyclopedic Survey of Type Design and Techniques Through History. Black Dog & Leventhal: 1998. .
Macmillan, Neil. An A–Z of Type Designers. Yale University Press: 2006. .

External links
Website of Barnbrook Design

Blackletter typefaces
Typefaces with text figures
Typefaces and fonts introduced in 1990
Typefaces designed by Jonathan Barnbrook